Kepler-16 is an eclipsing binary star system in the constellation of Cygnus that was targeted by the Kepler spacecraft. Both stars are smaller than the Sun; the primary, Kepler-16A, is a K-type main-sequence star and the secondary, Kepler-16B, is an M-type red dwarf. They are separated by 0.22 AU, and complete an orbit around a common center of mass every 41 days.
The system is host to one known extrasolar planet in circumbinary orbit: the Saturn-sized Kepler-16b.

Eclipses

The Kepler-16 system is almost edge-on to Earth and the two stars eclipse each other as they orbit.  The larger and brighter primary star is partially eclipsed by the secondary for about six hours and the brightness drops by about 0.15 magnitudes.  The secondary star is completely occulted by the primary star for about two hours, but the overall brightness only drops by about 0.02 magnitudes.  

There are also shallow eclipses caused by a large exoplanet.  When this transits across the primary star, the brightness drops by slightly more than the secondary eclipse.  When it transits the secondary star, the brightness drops by 0.001 magnitudes.

Planetary system

Kepler-16b is a gas giant that orbits the two stars in the Kepler-16 system. The planet is a third of Jupiter's mass and slightly smaller than Saturn at 0.7538 Jupiter radii, but is more dense. Kepler-16b completes a nearly circular orbit every 228.776 days.

References

 
K-type main-sequence stars
M-type main-sequence stars
Multi-star planetary systems
1611
Cygnus (constellation)
Eclipsing binaries
Planetary systems with one confirmed planet
J19161817+5145267